Phaecasiophora pertexta is a moth of the family Tortricidae. It is found in Vietnam and India.

References

Moths described in 1920
Olethreutini